El Mirage may refer to:

El Mirage, Arizona, a city in Maricopa County, Arizona, United States
El Mirage Dry Lake, a dry lake bed in the Mojave Desert, California, United States
El Mirage (album), the fifth solo album by Jimmy Webb
 El Mirage, California, an unincorporated community in San Bernardino County, California, United States